The Samsung E1107 (also known as Crest Solar or Solar Guru) is a mobile phone designed for a rural lower budget market. It was first released in India on July 10, 2009 with an initial price of 2,799.

Features
The feature set is spatial (clock, alarm, timer, stopwatch, organizer, T9 predictive text, calculator, converter, 10 polyphonic ringtones, 5 menu color themes, 3 wallpapers, 2 games (Sudoku and Super Jewel Quest), vibration, profiles, phonebook (500 entries) and call log (30 entries)) .

Additionally it has features especially interesting for a rural consumer market like an LED lamp and power saving mode. It also has support for a built-in phone tracker and SOS messages. No connectivity like USB, Bluetooth or Infrared is supported.

Applications
The Indian version also included a proprietary "Mobile prayer", a specialized feature for Indian religions that includes prayers and wallpapers for each as well as alerts for prayer time.

Solar panel
The battery supports up to 570 hours of standby or 8 hours of talk time. It can be charged through the solar panel for additional 5-10 minutes of talk time per hour of charging. According to the user manual the phone is not supposed to run on solar power alone for an extended period of time.

External links
Product overview
British user manual

E1107
Solar-powered mobile phones
Mobile phones introduced in 2009